Lepidodactylus vanuatuensis is a species of gecko. It is endemic to Vanuatu.

References

Lepidodactylus
Reptiles described in 1998
Endemic fauna of Vanuatu
Reptiles of Oceania
Reptiles of Vanuatu